Dùn a' Choin Duibh is a hillfort located near Torinturk, Argyll and Bute, Scotland. According to the local shanachies, the fort is named after a black wolfhound which was half wolf, which defended the fort. The fort provides views to the Inner Hebridean islands of Gigha, Islay and Jura and further to the Mull of Kintyre and Ireland.

Footnotes

Archaeological sites in Argyll and Bute
Hill forts in Scotland
Former populated places in Scotland
Scheduled monuments in Scotland